Larry Highbaugh (January 14, 1949 – March 21, 2017) was an American defensive back who played with the BC Lions from 1971 to 1972 and the Edmonton Eskimos from 1972 to 1983 of the Canadian Football League (CFL).

He won six Grey Cup championships while with the Eskimos and was a three-time CFL All-Star.

Highbaugh was inducted into the Canadian Football Hall of Fame in 2004 and in November, 2006, was voted one of the CFL's Top 50 players (#38) of the league's modern era by Canadian television sports network TSN.

After his football career ended he taught at South Gwinnett High School in Snellville, Georgia and died there at age 67.

His grandson, Tre Roberson, is a cornerback who plays for the Calgary Stampeders of the CFL

References

1949 births
2017 deaths
American players of Canadian football
BC Lions players
Canadian football defensive backs
Canadian Football Hall of Fame inductees
Edmonton Elks players
Indiana Hoosiers football players
Players of American football from Indianapolis
Players of Canadian football from Indianapolis